Odostomia striata is a species of sea snail, a marine gastropod mollusc in the family Pyramidellidae, the pyrams and their allies.

Distribution
This species occurs in the following locations:
 Atlantic
 Cobscook Bay
 Gulf of Maine
 North West Atlantic
 USA

References

External links
 To Biodiversity Heritage Library (6 publications)
 To Encyclopedia of Life
 To ITIS
 To World Register of Marine Species

striata
Gastropods described in 1880